War (also spelled Waar), also known as War-Jaintia, is an Austroasiatic language spoken by about 16,000 people in Bangladesh and 51,000 people in India. The language is spoken by the War Khasi tribe, i.e. War sub-tribe of Khasi people.

See also 

 Languages of India

References

Khasian languages
Languages of Bangladesh
Languages of India
Languages of Meghalaya